
 
 

Mingbool is a locality in the Australian state of South Australia located about  south-east of the state capital of Adelaide adjoining the border with the state of Victoria and about  north-west of the municipal seat of Mount Gambier.

Boundaries for the locality were created in February 1999 for the “long established name.”  Its name is derived from the cadastral unit of the Hundred of Mingbool and ultimately from an aboriginal word for “water.”

Mingbool’s western boundary aligns with the route of the Riddoch Highway while its eastern boundary is the state border.

The principal land use in the locality is primary production.  Two parcels of land in its south-west corner located close to both the Riddoch Highway and the Mount Gambier Airport in the adjoining locality of Wandilo are zoned for industrial purposes.

The Mingbool homestead and stables is listed as a state heritage place on the South Australian Heritage Register.

Mingbool is located within the federal division of Barker, the state electoral district of Mount Gambier and the local government area of the District Council of Grant.

References

 

Towns in South Australia
Limestone Coast